Canada won its second gold medal at the 2006 World Lacrosse Championship, held in London, Ontario from 14 to 22 July. The Canadians defeated the United States in the final 15–10 in front of 7,735 fans. It marked only the second loss by the Americans since the championship was founded in 1967. The first was Canada's historic 17–16 overtime win in the 1978 final. Canadian Geoff Snider was the tournament MVP for his outstanding face-off performance, winning 19 of 28 draws in the final.

Australia beat Iroquois 21–8 to earn the bronze medal. 21 nations played 72 games over the eight-day tournament, with Bermuda, Denmark, Finland, Italy, Latvia, the Netherlands, and Spain making their debuts. The games were played in TD Waterhouse Stadium.

The World Lacrosse Championship (WLC) is the international men's field lacrosse championship organized by the Federation of International Lacrosse (FIL) every four years. The 2006 WLC was the last to be sanctioned by the International Lacrosse Federation, the former governing body for men. In August 2008, the ILF merged with the former governing body for women's lacrosse, the International Federation of Women's Lacrosse Associations, to form the FIL.

Pool play
For the round-robin phase of the tournament, nations were separated into blue, red, orange and yellow divisions according to strength. Each of the twenty-one nations was eligible to win the championship.

Blue Division

The Blue Division featured the six strongest lacrosse nations: Australia, Canada, England, Iroquois, Japan, and the United States.

Blue Division standings after pool play were:

United States
Canada
Iroquois
Australia
England
Japan

Red Division
Red Division featured the next five strongest lacrosse nations: Hong Kong, Ireland, Italy, Scotland, and Wales.

Red Division standings after pool play were:

Ireland
Scotland
Italy
Wales
Hong Kong

Orange Division
The five countries competing in Orange Division were: the Czech Republic, Germany, the Netherlands, New Zealand, and South Korea.

Orange Division standings after pool play were:

Germany
Czech Republic
Netherlands
South Korea
New Zealand

Yellow Division
The Yellow Division featured Bermuda, Denmark, Finland, Latvia, and Spain.

Yellow Division standings after pool play were:

Finland
Latvia
Denmark
Spain
Bermuda

Finals
With the nations ranked amongst their division, they played off for their final standings. The winner from each lower group played a lower-ranked nation from Blue division for their shot at the championship.

The final standings were:

Canada
USA
Australia
Iroquois
England
Japan
Ireland
Germany
Finland
Italy
Scotland
Netherlands
Wales
Latvia
Czech Republic
Denmark
Spain
South Korea
New Zealand
Hong Kong
Bermuda

Awards

All World Team
The International Lacrosse Federation named an All World Team at the conclusion of the championship, along with four other individual awards.

Goalkeeper
 Chris Sanderson

Defence
 John Gagliardi 
 Brodie Merrill
 John Tokarua

Midfield
 Brett Bucktooth
 Jay Jalbert
 Geoff Snider

Attack
 John Grant, Jr. 
 Michael Powell 
 Jeff Zywicki

Best Positional Players
 Brodie Merrill - Defence
 Jay Jalbert - Midfield
 Jeff Zywicki - Attack

Tournament MVP
 Geoff Snider - Midfield, face-off

See also
World Lacrosse Championship
World Lacrosse, the unified governing body for world lacrosse
Field lacrosse

References

External links
Lacrosse World Championships 2006 at Activity Workshop
Standings and Scoreboard at Pointstreak
Photos and reports from the 2006 games
YouTube video of 2006 highlights

2006
World Lacrosse Championship
2006